The Congregational Church, or the First Church of Monson is a historic church located in Monson, Massachusetts that is currently affiliated with the United Church of Christ.

History 
The church was first established in 1762. A second meeting house was built in 1803, and was replaced by the current structure in 1873. The older building apparently survived beyond its days as a church and was then used as an A&P store. The Reverend Jesse Ives was minister from 1773-1805. The church is currently affiliated with the United Church of Christ. It is home to an organ which is a sought-after instrument for many recitals.

2011 Tornado 
On June 1, 2011, an apparent tornado severely damaged the church, toppling the steeple, and damaging buildings and trees in the adjacent area.

See also 
 Congregational Church

References

External links 
 Official church website

United Church of Christ churches in Massachusetts
Churches in Hampden County, Massachusetts
Religious organizations established in 1762
1762 establishments in Massachusetts
Churches completed in 1873
Monson, Massachusetts